The PBA on NBN and The PBA on IBC were brandings used for presentations of Philippine Basketball Association games produced by Summit Sports and was aired on Philippine television networks National Broadcasting Network and Intercontinental Broadcasting Corporation, respectively in 2003. The PBA on NBN and The PBA on IBC succeeded PBA's longtime TV partner Vintage Television.

Overview
The consortium of NBN and IBC took over the league's TV coverage after winning the TV rights over the league's longtime TV partner Vintage Television on November 8, 2002. The league considered the NBN-IBC bid because they can provide a wider coverage of the games not only in Metro Manila but also throughout the provinces. The consortium signed an agreement to the PBA to cover the games for three years, paying the league for almost P670 million.
NBN began airing the PBA games with the opening of the 2003 PBA season on February 23, 2003, while IBC first aired the PBA games on March 16, 2003.
The first week’s ratings of the games over NBN were negligible when compared to those of IBC which had telecast the games for several years, while even the two networks combined ratings were way below those of Viva TV in 2002. The use of two networks to broadcast the PBA also led to an experiment during the first few months of the season where NBN and IBC would air separate telecasts of a game aimed at different audiences, NBN's broadcasts were more traditionally styled, while IBC's broadcasts were aimed at a younger audience, utilizing a separate pool of younger personalities. The format was eventually dropped and replaced with straight simulcasts later on in the season.

Due to allegations by IBC that NBN had not paid close to 30 million pesos in rights fees, IBC stopped broadcasting PBA games at the end of October 2003. NBN would continue on until the finals of the 2003 Reinforced Conference. The PBA gave the consortium a formal notice on December 1, 2003, to settle their debts of unpaid rights fees, that reached up to P134 million, plus the P60 million penalty due to the stoppage of IBC to simulcast the league's games, else their contract will be terminated. A bid would be held for a new contract, where the Associated Broadcasting Company (now TV5 Network, Inc.) was awarded the broadcast rights for the league beginning in the 2004 season.

Commentators

Play-by-play

Sandi Geronimo
Mico Halili
TJ Manotoc
Boom Gonzalez
Carlo Del Carmen
Sev Sarmenta
Vitto Lazatin
Noel Zarate

Color
Norman Black
Ramon Fernandez
Jayvee Gayoso
Vic Ycasiano
Andrew Cruz
Dominic Uy
Danny Francisco
Quinito Henson
Leo Isaac
Yeng Guiao

Courtside reporters
Patricia Bermudez-Hizon
Janelle So
Mabel Reyes
Chiqui Roa-Puno
Lala Roque
Paolo Trillo
Mark Zambrano

See also
Philippine Basketball Association
List of programs aired by People's Television Network
List of programs previously broadcast by Intercontinental Broadcasting Corporation

References

NBN IBC
People's Television Network original programming
Intercontinental Broadcasting Corporation original programming
2003 Philippine television series debuts
2003 Philippine television series endings
Simulcasts
Philippine sports television series